Alipate Tuilevuka ("Pate" for short) (born 11 July 1980 in Fiji) is a former American rugby union player who played his club career with Old Puget Sound Beach. Tuilevuka played the wing, centre or flyhalf. He is the current head coach for the Seattle Seawolves of Major League Rugby (MLR).

College
Tuilevuka played for Brigham Young University in 2006 where he achieve All-American honors.

Club career
Following his collegiate career with BYU, Tuilevuka moved to Ireland where he played for Galwegians RFC. Having made appearances for the 'A' side, Tuilevuka was included in the Connacht match day squad for their match against the Glasgow Warriors on 5 October 2007. However, he failed to made an appearance for the side. He was a member of the 2012 Old Puget Sound Beach team that lost to New York Athletic Club RFC in the Super League final, having gone undefeated in the regular season.

International
Tuilevuka achieved the last of his ten caps in a victory over Russia on 5 June 2010. He was selected to tour with the USA Eagles squad for the Autumn 2010 tour of Europe, during which started on the wing against a Scotland A side.

Coaching career
Having worked as a skills coach with the Seawolves since 2019, in April 2021 it was announced that Tuilevuka would become the director of rugby as well as oversee the academy and Pacific Northwest rugby development.

External links
 

1980 births
Living people
American rugby union players
United States international rugby union players
Rugby union fly-halves